The 1974 Australian Formula 2 Championship was a CAMS sanctioned motor racing title for drivers of Australian Formula 2 racing cars. It was the eighth Australian Formula 2 Championship to be awarded by CAMS.

Calendar
The championship was contested over an eight round series with one race per round.
 Round 1, Hume Weir, Victoria, 16 June
 Round 2, Oran Park, New South Wales, 23 June
 Round 3, Amaroo Park, New South Wales, 21 July
 Round 4, Calder Park Raceway, Victoria, 18 August
 Round 5, Symmons Plains, Tasmania, 22 September
 Round 6, Phillip Island, Victoria, 13 October
 Round 7, Adelaide International Raceway, South Australia, 27 October
 Round 8, Lakeside, Queensland, 8 December

Points system
Championship points were awarded on a 9-6-4-3-2-1 basis to the first six eligible finishers at each round. Only holders of a General Competition License issued by CAMS were eligible for points and each driver could retain points only from his/her best seven round results.

Results

Note:
 New Zealander Ken Smith (March 712M/732 Ford) finished 4th at Hume Weir and 6th at Amaroo Park but was not eligible for points.
 Malaysian driver Sonny Rajah (March 732 Ford) finished 6th at Hume Weir and 3rd at Symmons Plains but was not eligible for points.
 There were only four eligible finishers at the Symmons Plains round.

Notes and references

External links
 Image of 1974 Australian Formula 2 Champion Leo Geoghegan

Australian Formula 2 Championship
Formula 2 Championship